The World Junior Alpine Skiing Championships 2013 were the 32nd World Junior Alpine Skiing Championships, held between 21–26 February 2013 in Québec, Canada.

Speed events were held at Le Massif and technical events at Mont-Sainte-Anne.

Medal winners

Men's events

Women's events

Team event

External links 
World Junior Alpine Skiing Championships 2013 results at fis-ski.com

World Junior Alpine Skiing Championships
2013 in alpine skiing
2013 in Canadian sports
Alpine skiing competitions in Canada
Skiing in Quebec